The 2022 Arnold Clark Cup was the first edition of the Arnold Clark Cup, an invitational women's association football tournament hosted by The Football Association, held from 17 to 23 February 2022.

Format
The four invited teams played each other once in a round-robin tournament. Points awarded in the group stage follow the formula of three points for a win, one point for a draw, and zero points for a loss.

Venues

Several fixtures were originally planned to be scheduled as double-headers with shared ticketing, but plans were scrapped due to COVID-19 restrictions. As a result, matches that did not feature England had low attendances, including 249 spectators at the opening match between Germany and Spain.

Teams

Squads

The four national teams involved in the tournament could register a maximum of 25 players, which Canada and Germany did, while England registered a 24-player squad and Spain registered a 23-player squad.

Standings

Results
All times are local (UTC±0)

Goalscorers

References

External links
Official website

2022
Arnold Clark Cup
2021–22 in English women's football
2021–22 in Spanish women's football
February 2022 sports events in the United Kingdom
2021–22 in German women's football
Football in England